John Curtis ( – 30 November 1813) was a British Member of Parliament. The son of a Bristol merchant, he was MP for Wells in Somerset from 1782 to 1784; in 1784 he stood at Saltash (Cornwall), where he was defeated, but returned the House of Commons as MP for Steyning (Sussex) from 1791 to 1794.

References 

 Lewis Namier & John Brooke, The History of Parliament: The House of Commons 1754–1790 (London: HMSO, 1964)

1750s births
1813 deaths
Members of the Parliament of Great Britain for English constituencies
British MPs 1780–1784
British MPs 1790–1796